Frank Johnson (6 September 1916 – 12 May 1979) was an  Australian rules footballer who played with Geelong in the Victorian Football League (VFL).

Notes

External links 

1916 births
1979 deaths
Australian rules footballers from Victoria (Australia)
Geelong Football Club players